Mike Urbanija (born 26 December 1989 in Murska Sobota) is an inactive Slovenian tennis player.

Urbanija has a career high ATP singles ranking of 477 achieved on 18 August 2014. He also has a career high ATP doubles ranking of 541 achieved on 12 May 2014.

Playing for Slovenia in Davis Cup, Urbanija has a W/L record of 0–3.

External links
 
 
 

1989 births
Living people
Slovenian male tennis players
People from Murska Sobota
People from Beltinci